The Fenian dynamite campaign (or Fenian bombing campaign) was a bombing campaign orchestrated by Irish republicans against the British Empire, between the years 1881 and 1885. The campaign was associated with Fenianism; that is to say the Irish revolutionary organisations which aimed to establish an independent Irish Republic; such as the Irish Republican Brotherhood, the Fenian Brotherhood, Clan na Gael and the United Irishmen of America. The campaign, led by Jeremiah O'Donovan Rossa and other Irishmen exiled in the United States, was a form of asymmetrical warfare and targeted infrastructure, government, military and police targets in Great Britain (particularly London). Over 80 people were injured in the attacks and one young boy was killed, as well as two of the bombers in the 1884 attack on London Bridge. The campaign led to the establishment of secret police group Special Branch (originally known as the Special Irish Branch).

Timeline of the campaign
1881
14 Jan 1881: A bomb exploded at a military barracks in Salford, Lancashire. A young boy was killed
16 Mar 1881: A bomb was found and defused in the Mansion House, London.
5 May 1881: Bomb explodes at Chester Barracks, Chester.
16 May 1881: Bomb attack at Liverpool police barracks.
10 June 1881: Bomb planted at Liverpool Town Hall,
30 June 1881: Disguised explosives found aboard SS Malta at Liverpool.
2 July 1881: Disguised explosives found aboard SS Bavaria in Liverpool.
1882
12 May 1882: A bomb exploded at the Mansion House, London.
1883
20 January 1883: In Glasgow, bombs exploded at Tradeston Gasworks, Possil Road Bridge and Buchanan Street Station. About a dozen people were injured.
15 Mar 1883: In London, bombs exploded at government buildings at Whitehall and at the offices of The Times newspaper. There were no injuries.
29 March 1883: Fenians Denis Deasy, Timothy Featherstone and Patsy Flanagan are arrested while police in County Cork raid the homes and businesses of associates of Deasy and Flanagan.
28 May 1883: Future Easter Rising leader Tom Clarke is sentenced to penal servitude for life.
11 June 1883: Gallagher Trials begin.
22 August 1883: Fenian 'Red' Jim McDermott arrested.
31 August 1883: Those responsible for Glasgow bombings in January were arrested.
30 Oct 1883: Two bombs exploded in the London Underground, at Paddington (Praed Street) station (injuring 70 people) and Westminster Bridge station.
December 1883: Trial of Glasgow bombers.
1884
26 Feb 1884: A bomb exploded in the left-luggage room of Victoria station, London. The building was empty at the time and no-one was injured. Other bombs were defused at Charing Cross station, Ludgate Hill station and Paddington station.
11 April 1884: John Daly arrested with explosives at Birkenhead.
30 May 1884: Three bombs exploded in London: at the headquarters of the Metropolitan Police's Criminal Investigation Department (CID) and Special Irish Branch in Scotland Yard; in the basement of the Carlton Club, a gentlemen's club for members of the Conservative Party; and outside the home of Conservative MP Sir Watkin Williams-Wynn. Ten people were injured. A fourth bomb was planted at the foot of Nelson's Column but failed to explode.
30 July 1884: John Daly, James Egan and William O'Donnell tried at Warwick Assizes under charges of treason.
13 Dec 1884: Two American-Irish Republicans, who were planting a bomb on London Bridge, were killed when their bomb prematurely exploded. One of the men was William Mackey Lomasney.
1885
2 Jan 1885: A bomb exploded at Gower Street station, London.
24 Jan 1885: Three bombs exploded in London, in the House of Commons chamber, in Westminster Hall and in the Banqueting Room of the Tower of London. Two police officers and four civilians were injured. Two men; Henry Burton and James E. Gilbert, were sentenced to penal servitude for life as a result.
10 February 1885: Dynamite found at Harrow Road, London.

See also
 List of Irish uprisings
 Fenian Rising
 Fenian raids
 Manchester Martyrs and Cuba Five
 S-Plan - a bombing campaign in England by the Irish Republican Army
 Physical force Irish republicanism

References and notes

Further reading

McKenna, Joseph The Irish-American Dynamite Campaign: A History, 1881-1896 (2012) McFarland & Co

External links
‘One skilled scientist is worth an army’ – The Fenian Dynamite campaign 1881-85 at The Irish Story
Thomas Clarke Treason Felony Convict J464 at The Irish Story

1880s in England
1880s in Ireland
Irish Republican Brotherhood